Josué González Cortes (born 9 July 1988) is a Costa Rican cyclist, who is suspended from the sport, after an adverse analytical finding for ostarine at the 2015 Vuelta Ciclista a Costa Rica.

Major results

2011
 8th Overall Vuelta Ciclista a Costa Rica
2014
 National Road Championships
1st  Time trial
3rd Road race
 3rd Overall Vuelta Ciclista a Costa Rica
2015
 1st  Time trial, National Road Championships
 Pan American Road Championships
2nd  Road race
8th Time trial
3rd Overall Vuelta Ciclista a Costa Rica
 5th Overall Vuelta Mexico Telmex
1st Mountains classification

References

External links

1988 births
Living people
Costa Rican male cyclists
21st-century Costa Rican people